A drill hall is a building where soldiers practice and perform military drills.

Drill Hall or drill hall may also refer to:

Buildings used as drill halls
Beatty Street Drill Hall, Vancouver, Canada
Carlton Place drill hall, Southampton, England, UK

Buildings converted to other uses
 Bank Parade drill hall, Burnley, Lancashire, England, UK
 Church Street drill hall, Brighton, Sussex, England, UK
 Dalmeny Street drill hall, a community arts and education centre in Dalmeny Street, Edinburgh, Scotland, UK
 Drill Hall, Adelaide, part of the Torrens Parade Ground in Adelaide, South Australia
 Drill Hall Gallery, an art gallery owned by the Australian National University, Canberra
 Drill Hall Library, Chatham, Kent, England, UK
 Forrest Hill drill hall, Edinburgh, Scotland, UK
 Phoenix Street drill hall, Lancaster, England, UK
 Poyser Street drill hall, Wrexham, Wales, UK
 RADA Studios, a theatrical venue in Chenies Street, Bloomsbury, London, formerly The Drill Hall

Architectural disambiguation pages